The 1856 United States presidential election in North Carolina took place on November 4, 1856, as part of the 1856 United States presidential election. Voters chose 10 representatives, or electors to the Electoral College, who voted for president and vice president.

North Carolina voted for the Democratic candidate, James Buchanan, over Whig candidate Millard Fillmore. Fillmore ran under the American Party ticket in most states, but ran as a Whig in North Carolina after receiving the endorsement of the party at the 1856 Whig National Convention. Buchanan won North Carolina by a margin of 13.56%.

Republican Party candidate John C. Frémont was not on the ballot in the state.

Results

References

North Carolina
1856
1856 North Carolina elections